John Tipton (August 14, 1786 – April 5, 1839) was from Tennessee and became a farmer in Indiana; an officer in the 1811 Battle of Tippecanoe, and veteran officer of the War of 1812, in which he reached the rank of Brigadier General; and politician. He was elected to the Indiana General Assembly in 1819, and in 1831 as US Senator from the state of Indiana, serving until 1838. He was appointed as US Indian Agent and was selected to lead the militia in removing Menominee's band of Potawatomie in 1838; they were relocated to Kansas, Indian Territory.

Biography
Tipton, a son of Joshua and Janet Shields Tipton, was born in what is now Sevier County, Tennessee. When Tipton was only 6 years old his father was killed by Native Americans. His great uncle, also named John Tipton, was a prominent man in the area. When Tipton was an infant, his uncle's house was besieged by supporters of an effort to create the 14th state in Northeastern Tennessee called the State of Franklin.

At the age of 17, Tipton moved to Harrison County, Indiana. In 1806 he married his 1st cousin Martha Shields, a daughter of John Shields of Lewis and Clark fame. He became a farmer.  Fighting various Native American tribes in the area, he commanded a militia unit of the Yellow Jackets in the Battle of Tippecanoe campaign in 1811, and on the 6th of June 1813, he fought at the Battle of Stoney Creek, Ontario, Canada.  He served as Major in command of two companies of Indiana Rangers at Fort Vallonia during the War of 1812 with Great Britain. When peace was declared, Tipton was promoted to Brigadier-General.

Tipton's marriage eventually fell apart and he was divorced in 1816. He entered politics, being elected as a member of the Indiana State House of Representatives and serving two terms, from 1819 to 1823. During this time, he founded the town of Columbus, Indiana originally known as Tiptonia. He also participated in commissions to establish a new state capital for Indiana and to set the boundaries between Indiana and Illinois. In 1823, he was appointed as the United States Indian agent for the Potawatomi and Miami tribes.

In 1825, he married again, this time to Matilda Spencer, the daughter of the late Captain Spier Spencer. Her father died at the Battle of Tippecanoe in 1811.

In 1831, Tipton was elected by the state legislature to a seat in the United States Senate from Indiana to fill the unexpired term of James Noble who had died. He was reelected to a full term in 1832. A member of the United States Democratic Party, Tipton was a strong supporter of Andrew Jackson.

He served as chairman of the committees on roads and canals and Native American affairs from 1837 to 1839. In 1838, at the behest of Governor David Wallace, Tipton was selected as captain of the militia to organize the forced removal of 859 Potawatomi from the vicinity of Plymouth, to which they had agreed by treaty. He started the group on the two-month-long "Trail of Death" to Kansas. More than 40 of the natives died, most of them children.

Death and legacy
Tipton declined to run for reelection due to poor health, and his term expired a month before his death. He died in Logansport, Indiana by heart failure.  He is interred in Mount Hope Cemetery in Logansport, Indiana.

The towns of Tipton, Indiana, and Iowa, and Tipton County, Indiana are named after him.

References

External links
John Tipton Collection, manuscript collection finding aid, Indiana State Library.
John Tipton Collection, digital collection of ISL manuscripts at Indiana Memory.
John Tipton Collection, Rare Books and Manuscripts, Indiana State Library
John Tipton Portrait

1786 births
1839 deaths
People from Sevier County, Tennessee
Indiana Democratic-Republicans
Jacksonian United States senators from Indiana
Democratic Party United States senators from Indiana
Democratic Party members of the Indiana House of Representatives
United States Indian agents
People from Logansport, Indiana
Columbus, Indiana
People from Indiana in the War of 1812
Burials in Indiana